Thomas de Aston (died 1376) was a Canon of Windsor from 1369 to 1376

Career

He was appointed:
Chaplain of St George's Chapel, Windsor Castle 1361
Canon and Prebendary of the Collegiate Church of Norton (diocese of Durham) 
Prebendary of Wells 1367

He was appointed to the third stall in St George's Chapel, Windsor Castle in 1369 and held the canonry until 1376.

Notes 

1376 deaths
Canons of Windsor
Year of birth unknown